Harold Thomas Cherne (March 7, 1907 – January 1983) was an American football offensive lineman in the National Football League for the Boston Redskins.  He played college football at DePaul University.

1907 births
1983 deaths
People from LaSalle, Illinois
American football offensive linemen
Boston Redskins players
DePaul Blue Demons football players